The NWF North American Heavyweight Championship was a secondary singles title in the American professional wrestling promotion, the National Wrestling Federation. The title started in 1968 as a National Wrestling Alliance title, named the NWA North American Heavyweight Championship (Buffalo/Cleveland version) until the NWF was founded in 1970. It was then renamed with the NWF name. The NWF would close in 1974, and the title migrated to New Japan Pro-Wrestling. The title was then retired in 1981, after announcement of the IWGP, a new governing body, which would promote their own-branded championships.

Title history

See also
 National Wrestling Alliance
 National Wrestling Federation
 New Japan Pro-Wrestling

Explanatory footnotes

References

External links
 NWF North American Heavyweight Title History

Heavyweight wrestling championships
National Wrestling Federation championships
New Japan Pro-Wrestling championships
North American professional wrestling championships